Horymír Netuka (17 September 1929 – 26 August 2001) was a Slovak boxer. He competed in the men's heavyweight event at the 1952 Summer Olympics.

References

1929 births
2001 deaths
Czechoslovak male boxers
Slovak male boxers
Olympic boxers of Czechoslovakia
Boxers at the 1952 Summer Olympics
People from Trstená
Sportspeople from the Žilina Region
Heavyweight boxers